Ginebis is a genus of sea snails, marine gastropod molluscs in the family Eucyclidae.

Species
Species within the genus Ginebis include:
 Ginebis argenteonitens (Lischke, 1872)
 Ginebis corolla Habe & Kosuge, 1970
 Ginebis crumpii (Pilsbry, 1893)
 Ginebis hamadai Kosuge, 1980
 Ginebis japonica (Dall, 1925)
Species brought into synonymy
 Ginebis convexiuscula (Yokoyama, 1920): synonym of Ginebis argenteonitens (Lischke, 1872)
 Ginebis kirai Sakurai, 1983: synonym of Ginebis argenteonitens (Lischke, 1872)
 Ginebis nakamigawai Sakurai, 1983: synonym of Ginebis argenteonitens (Lischke, 1872)

References

 
Eucyclidae